Thomas Heaton (2 June 1897–unknown) was an English footballer who played in the Football League for Blackburn Rovers and Oldham Athletic.

References

1897 births
English footballers
Association football midfielders
English Football League players
Blackburn Rovers F.C. players
Oldham Athletic A.F.C. players
Manchester North End F.C. players
Year of death missing